The Boardwalks is a 7.8 hectare Local Nature Reserve in Peterborough in Cambridgeshire. It is owned and managed by Peterborough City Council.

The site runs along the north bank of the River Nene. It has ponds with water beetles, frogs, toads and smooth newts. Bats nest in large willows, and birds include herons and woodpeckers.

A footpath along the north bank of the River Nene goes through the site, and there is also access by a footpath from the road called Thorpe Meadows (starting at a footbridge over a water channel south of Water End).

References

Local Nature Reserves in Cambridgeshire